This is the discography of The Sports, a popular Australian rock group which performed and recorded four studio albums between 1976 and 1981.

Albums

Studio albums

Live albums

Compilation albums

Extended plays

Singles

References

Rock music group discographies
Pop music group discographies
Discographies of Australian artists